Zangard may refer to:
 Zangard, Hormozgan (زنگارد - Zangārd)
 Zangard, Khuzestan (زنگرد - Zangard)